Coleman O. Parsons, also Coleman Parsons, (1905-1991), was a scholar, writer and professor of literature, last as Professor Emeritus of English at CUNY's City College.

He was born in Ripley, Va., Parsons attended University of Southern California, University of Chicago before receiving his an A.B. (Artium Baccalaureus, A.B. or B.A.) at Columbia University and held a doctorate from Yale.

Dr. Parsons, a premier authority on Scottish literature and culture, joined the City College faculty in 1937 and began teaching there full-time in 1947. Dr. Parsons was known as an excellent and challenging professor who participated heavily in intellectual and public life outside of the classroom.  He was an active member and leader in the Andiron Club, an exclusive cultural and fraternal organization in New York City. Dr. Parson was also an active Freemason.
 
He was the author of one of the most important critical works on Sir Walter Scott and nineteenth century Scottish literature, "Witchcraft and Demonology in Scott's Fiction," published in 1964, and wrote extensively for academic journals in the United States, Scotland, England and Germany.

In June 1991 Dr. Parsons died at his home in Manhattan following complications while recovering from a stroke.  Numerous scholarships and awards are named in his honor. His papers are held at Columbia University to benefit researchers.

References

1905 births
1991 deaths
University of Southern California alumni
University of Chicago alumni
Columbia University alumni
Yale University alumni
City University of New York faculty
American academics of English literature